Until the Holocaust, Jews were a significant part of the population of Eastern Europe. Outside Poland, the largest population was in the European part of the USSR, especially Ukraine (1.5 million in the 1930s), but major populations also existed in Hungary, Romania, and Czechoslovakia. Here are lists of some prominent East European Jews, arranged by country of origin.

List of Czech, Bohemian, Moravian, and Slovak Jews
List of Hungarian Jews
List of Polish Jews
List of Romanian Jews
List of Belarusian Jews
List of Ukrainian Jews
List of Jews born in the former Russian Empire (and the former Soviet Union)

Azerbaijan

 Max Black, philosopher
 Misha Black, designer; brother of Max Black
 Bella Davidovich, pianist
 Gavril Abramovich Ilizarov, Soviet physician, known for inventing the Ilizarov apparatus
 Garry Kasparov, world chess champion of jewish-armenian descent
 Lev Landau, physicist, Nobel Prize (1962)
 Lev Nussimbaum, writer (a.k.a. Kurban Said)
 Vladimir Rokhlin, mathematician

Moldova (formerly Bessarabia) 

 Lev Simonovich Berg, geographer & zoologist
 Jacob Bernstein-Kogan
 Gary Bertini, conductor
 Bronfman family
 Samuel Bronfman, founder of Seagram
 Samuel Cohen, composer of Hatikvah
 I. A. L. Diamond, comedy writer
 Meir Dizengoff, politician
 Giora Feidman, musician
 William F. Friedman, cryptographer
 A. N. Frumkin, electrochemist
 Mikhail Gershenzon, historian
 Bianna Golodryga, journalist
 Nachum Gutman, painter
 Idel Ianchelevici, sculptor
 Mona May Karff, chess player
 Boris Katz, artificial intelligence researcher
 Gary Koshnitsky, chess player
 Abba Ptachya Lerner, economist
 Avigdor Lieberman, politician
 Oleg Maisenberg, concert pianist
 Lewis Milestone, director
 Sigmund Mogulesko, singer, actor, composer
 Sacha Moldovan, painter
 Moishe Oysher, Yiddish singer
Boris Polak (born 1954), Israeli world champion and Olympic sport shooter
 Mendel Portugali, An Hashomer founder
 Sir Michael Postan, historian
 Anton Rubinstein, pianist
 Joseph ben Yehuda Leib Shapotshnick, rabbi
 Volodia Teitelboim
 Andy Zaltzman, British comedian
 Mark Zeltser, concert pianist
 Meir Zorea, general in the Israel Defense Forces

Slovakia
 Joseph Goldberger, discovered cure for pellagra
 Juraj Herz, actor and film director
 Ignác Kolisch, chess player
 Peter Lorre, actor
 Robert Maxwell, media mogul
 Ivan Reitman, film director
 Richard Réti, chess player
 Herman Steiner, chess player
 Rudolf Vrba, coauthor of the Vrba–Wetzler report, chemist 
 Alfred Wetzler, writer

See also
List of Galician Jews
List of Sephardic Jews

East European Jews
Jews
Jews,East European